Glenn Rupertus is a Canadian former biathlete who competed in the 1988 Winter Olympics, the 1992 Winter Olympics, and the 1994 Winter Olympics.

Glenn was born in Wetaskiwin, Alberta, on 26 July 1964.

References

1964 births
Living people
Canadian male biathletes
Olympic biathletes of Canada
Biathletes at the 1988 Winter Olympics
Biathletes at the 1992 Winter Olympics
Biathletes at the 1994 Winter Olympics